Inder Pal Khosla is a retired Indian diplomat. He served as the Indian High Commissioner to Bangladesh and Afghanistan.
Son of Shakuntala and Justice GD Khosla.
Has two daughters
Education: 1954: The Doon School BA, MA (Econ).
In 1960 joined Indian Foreign Service.
Served in Vienna (1963), Algiers, Thimpu, Dhaka and Kabul.
1974: India's representative at Bhutan. 
1975-1976: Charge d'Affaires in Jeddah, (Saudi Arabia). 
1976-1980: Ambassador to United Arab Emirates. 
Feb 1980-Jan 1985: Jt Sec, Master of ceremonies Ministry of External Affairs (India).
Jan 1985-: High Commissioner to Dhaka Bangladesh. 
-1989: High Commissioner to Canberra Australia.
1989-1990: Ambassador to Kabul Afghanistan.
1990-1992: Ambassador to Iran. 
1992:Ambassador to Netherlands. 
1993-Jan 1995: at Mohammad Hamid Ansari Permanent Representative of India to the United Nations

Bibliography 
India and the Gulf by Inder Pal Khosla, Konark Publishers 2009, .

References 

Living people
1938 births
Ambassadors of India to the Netherlands
Academic staff of the National Defence College, India